In Greek mythology, Anippe (Ancient Greek: Ἀνίππης) was the Egyptian daughter of the river-god Nilus, thus she can be considered as a naiad. Anippe bore King Busiris of Egypt to Poseidon. This son had the habit of killing strangers under the pretense of hospitality and was ultimately slain by the hero Heracles with his club.

Otherwise, Busiris's mother was called Libya or Lysianassa.

Notes

References 

 Apollodorus, The Library with an English Translation by Sir James George Frazer, F.B.A., F.R.S. in 2 Volumes, Cambridge, MA, Harvard University Press; London, William Heinemann Ltd. 1921. ISBN 0-674-99135-4. Online version at the Perseus Digital Library. Greek text available from the same website.
 Lucius Mestrius Plutarchus, Moralia with an English Translation by Frank Cole Babbitt. Cambridge, MA. Harvard University Press. London. William Heinemann Ltd. 1936. Online version at the Perseus Digital Library. Greek text available from the same website.
Tzetzes, John, Book of Histories, Book VII-VIII translated by Vasiliki Dogani from the original Greek of T. Kiessling's edition of 1826. Online version at theio.com

Naiads